"Give Me Up" is a song by Italian singer Michael Fortunati released as a single in 1986. A pioneering work of Eurobeat, it has since been recorded by several Japanese artists including BaBe, Beni Arashiro, Melon Kinenbi, Yōko Nagayama, Nami Tamaki and W (on their 2004 album Duo U&U). A remix was featured in the 2006 arcade game Dance Dance Revolution SuperNova, with the original being featured in test versions of the 2008 arcade game UBeat.

BaBe version
Japanese pop duo BaBe recorded a Japanese-language cover of "Give Me Up" as their debut single, released on February 21, 1987.

Nami Tamaki version

On March 25, 2009, it was covered by Nami Tamaki for her sixteenth single, and her first in 2009. It is based on the version by BaBe. The music video for the single was posted on Universal J-s YouTube page. The music video features Tamaki wearing '80s-style clothes and dancing in a brightly colored room with friends; it also cuts to shots of her wearing a large pink bow on her head and also one of her on a bicycle. Her pet dog also makes an appearance in the music video. The music video was first aired on TV on February 20.

Single versions 
CD (Regular Edition)
 "Give Me Up"
 "イチズナネガイ (Ichizu na negai) (Wholehearted Wish)"
 "彼女 (Kanojo) (Girlfriend)"
 "Give Me Up" (Instrumental)

CD (Limited Edition)

 "Give Me Up"
 "イチズナネガイ (Ichizu na negai)"
 "In My Life"
 "Give Me Up" (Instrumental)

CD+DVD (Limited Edition)

CD:
 "Give Me Up"
 "イチズナネガイ (Ichizu na negai)"
 "Give Me Up" (Instrumental)

DVD:
 "Give Me Up" Music Clip

References 
 http://www.tamaki-nami.net/
 https://web.archive.org/web/20090210090900/http://tokyo-nights.org/forum/f12/tamaki-namis-new-single-give-me-up-3-25-a-39620/

1986 debut singles
1987 debut singles
2009 singles
Italo disco songs
Nami Tamaki songs
EMI Records singles
Universal Music Japan singles
1986 songs